Cvlt Ov The Svn (also known as COTS or the more conventional spelling Cult of the Sun) is a Finnish metal band combining black metal with pop-music and supernatural themes, often described as occult rock.

Biography 
Cvlt Ov The Svn call their music genre "Occult Murder Pop" and have remained anonymous due to being "musicians of renown in Finland". Cvlt Ov The Svn are signed with Napalm Records and debuted with the single The Murderer in 2018 followed by another single Whore Of Babylon in the same year. They released their debut full-length album in 2021 titled We Are The Dragon, which obtained mediocre reviews with 3 out of 5 stars from both Soundi and Inferno.

The nameless leader of the band has mentioned thematic influence by movies such as The Exorcist and The Ninth Gate, as well musical inspiration by bands such as Type O Negative, Marilyn Manson, Turbonegro, Ghost, Pantera, Backyard Babies, and even Roxette, and that his musical background stems from being a black metal drummer.

Discography 
Adapted from Bandcamp, and Spotify.

Albums 

 We Are The Dragon (May 2021, Napalm Records)

Singles 

 The Murderer (October 2018)
 Whore Of Babylon (December 2018)

Music videos 

 The Pit (May 2019)
 Luna in the Sky Forever (September 2019)
 My Venom (March 2021)

References 

Finnish black metal musical groups
Musical groups established in 2018